Michael Patrick Haley (born 28 June 1994) is an English-born, Irish-qualified professional rugby union player, currently playing for Irish province Munster in the United Rugby Championship and European Rugby Champions Cup and the Ireland national team. Haley was born and grew up in England, but he qualifies for Ireland through his maternal grandmother. He plays as a fullback.

Club career

Sale Sharks
Haley made his professional debut for Sale against Saracens on 10 March 2013, in the semi-final of the 2012–13 LV Cup.

Munster
It was announced in February 2018 that Haley would be joining Irish United Rugby Championship side Munster on a three-year contract at the start of the 2018–19 season. Haley is Irish-qualified through his maternal grandmother, who hails from Tralee, County Kerry. He made his competitive debut for Munster on 1 September 2018, starting at fullback in their opening 2018–19 Pro14 fixture against South African side Cheetahs in Thomond Park, a game which Munster won 38–0.

Haley made his European debut for Munster on 13 October 2018, starting in the provinces 10–10 draw with Exeter Chiefs in Sandy Park in the sides' opening 2018–19 Champions Cup fixture. He scored his first try for Munster on 20 October 2018, doing so in the provinces 36–22 win against Gloucester. Haley signed a two-year contract extension with Munster in March 2021, and extended that contract by a further two years in September 2022. He started and scored one try in Munster's historic 28–14 win against a South Africa XV in Páirc Uí Chaoimh on 10 November 2022.

International career
Haley received his first call-up to the senior England squad by coach Eddie Jones for a three-day training camp in May 2016. He made his debut for the England Saxons on their tour against South Africa A in June 2016. However, this appearance did not tie him fully to the RFU because, at the time, South Africa A was not SARU's second team. Haley was subsequently named in a provisional elite player squad for the 2016–17 season.

Haley represented an England XV in the Old Mutual Wealth Cup against the Barbarians in a non-cap international at Twickenham Stadium in May 2017. Again, this match did not tie him to the RFU as the Barbarians are a club team, and he thus remained eligible for future Ireland selection.

In May 2019, Haley was named by Ireland head coach Joe Schmidt in a 44-man training squad for the 2019 Rugby World Cup. Along with Munster teammate Jean Kleyn, this was Haley's first time being named in an Ireland squad. He made his debut for Ireland in their 2019 Rugby World Cup warm-up match against Italy on 10 August 2019, featuring as a replacement in the 29–10 win. However, Haley was dropped from the squad before the 2019 Rugby World Cup.

References

External links
Munster Profile
URC Profile

Ireland Profile

1994 births
Living people
English people of Irish descent
People educated at Hutton Grammar School
Rugby union players from Preston, Lancashire
English rugby union players
Sale Sharks players
Preston Grasshoppers R.F.C. players
Munster Rugby players
Ireland international rugby union players
English expatriate rugby union players
English expatriate sportspeople in Ireland
Expatriate rugby union players in Ireland
Rugby union fullbacks